Suprême sauce is a classic and popular "daughter sauce" of French cuisine. It is made from mother sauce velouté, then thickened with cream.

Recipes
According the Larousse Gastronomique, a seminal work of French haute cuisine, first published in 1938, suprême sauce is made from the mother sauce velouté (white stock thickened with a white roux—in the case of suprême sauce, chicken stock is usually preferred), reduced with heavy cream or crème fraîche, and then strained through a fine sieve.

A light squeeze of lemon juice is commonly added. In many cases, chefs also choose to add finely chopped and lightly sautéed mushrooms to the dish, although this was not specifically mentioned in Larousse Gastronomique or by Auguste Escoffier, the "Emperor of the World's Kitchens", who was an arbiter of classic French cuisine.

It is possible to make a similar sauce to pass for sauce suprême by taking béchamel sauce (a classic mother sauce made with butter, flour and milk), with a poultry stock (effectively a shortcut to making a velouté by combining the roux and stock elements) and butter.

The Cook's Decameron suggests the following recipe: the sauce is made by placing three-quarters of a pint (350ml) of white sauce into a saucepan, and when it is nearly boiling, adding half a cup (120 ml) of concentrated fowl stock. It should then be reduced until the sauce is quite thick, passed through a chinois strainer into a bain-marie and have added two tablespoons (30 ml) of cream.

See also
 List of sauces
 Supreme (cookery)

References

French sauces
White sauces